Steve Reid (December 16, 1914October 31, 2009) was an American football player. He was elected to the College Football Hall of Fame in 1985.

References

External links

1914 births
2009 deaths
All-American college football players
American football guards
Northwestern Wildcats football players
College Football Hall of Fame inductees